Alberto Cantù (1950 – 18 January 2021) was an Italian musicologist and musical critic. He studied music history at the Conservatorio di Como and was a musical critic for Giornale from 1976 to 2006. He was a member of the Istituto di studi paganiniani in Genoa, the Istituto di studi pucciniani in Milan, and the Centro studi Felice Romani in Moneglia.

Works
I 24 capricci e i 6 concerti di Paganini (1980)
Le opere di Paganini (1982)
Respighi compositore (1985)
Ottorino Respighi (1985)
Invito all'ascolto di Paganini (1988)
La lanterna magica (1991)
Renato De Barbieri nell'arco del violino (1993)
Intorno a Locatelli (1996)
Melodrammi con figure (2001)
Da Farinelli a Camilleri (2003)
Yehudi Menuhin l'Orfeo tragico (2006)
Jascha Heifetz l'Imperatore solo (2007)
L'universo di Puccini da Le Villi a Turandot (2008)
David Oistrakh. Lo splendore della coerenza (2009)
Ermanno Wolf-Ferrari. La musica, la grazia, il silenzio (2012)

References

External links
 

1950 births
2021 deaths
People from Genoa
Italian music critics
Italian musicologists